Menuhin or  Menuchin is the surname of:
Hephzibah Menuhin (1920–1981), American-Jewish concert pianist
Joel Ryce-Menuhin (1933–1998), Jungian psychologist
Linda Menuhin (born 1950), Iraqi-born Israeli journalist, editor, and blogger
Moshe Menuhin (1893–1983), teacher and author, father of Yehudi, Hephzibah and Yaltah Menuhin
Yaltah Menuhin (1921–2001), American-Jewish pianist
Yehudi Menuhin (1916–1999), American-Jewish (later Swiss, then British) violin virtuoso and conductor
Gerard Menuhin (born 1948), author, son of Yehudi
Jeremy Menuhin (born 1951), British pianist, son of Yehudi

Places
Menuhin Festival Gstaad, a Gstaad festival
Yehudi Menuhin International Competition for Young Violinists, an international violin competition for young violinists named after Yehudi Menuhin

See also
Yehudi Menuhin School
Mnuchin
Minuchin

Surnames